Pithomyia is a genus of flies in the family Stratiomyidae.

Species
Pithomyia laevifrons Kertész, 1916
Pithomyia stuckenbergi James, 1975

References

Stratiomyidae
Brachycera genera
Taxa named by Kálmán Kertész
Diptera of Africa